Silver Planet was a dance music record label active throughout the late nineties and early 2000s, amassing a back catalogue of over seventy recordings, including the earliest releases of DJ and producer James Holden. Timo Maas also released on the label.

See also
 List of record labels

External links
Silver Planet on Discogs

British record labels
House music record labels